Arkansas Highway 218 (AR 218, Hwy. 218) is an east–west state highway in Crittenden County, Arkansas. The route of  runs from US Route 70 (US 70) and US 79 at Shearerville north across Interstate 40 (I-40) through rural Crittenden County to Highway 147 at Cunningham Corner.

Route description
Highway 218 begins at Shearerville at US 70 and continues south as US 79. The route runs north over Interstate 40 as exit 265 and continues northeast. Highway 218 has a junction with Highway 50 before passing through Julius and terminating at AR 147 at Cunningham Corner.

Major intersections

See also

References

218
Transportation in Crittenden County, Arkansas